Somsak Musikaphan is a professional footballer from Thailand. He is currently playing for MH Nakhon Si City in Thai League 3 as a  forward.

References

External links
 

1996 births
Living people
Somsak Musikaphan
Association football forwards
Somsak Musikaphan
Somsak Musikaphan
Somsak Musikaphan